Leon Mark "Biddy" Dolan (July 9, 1881 – July 15, 1950) was a Major League Baseball first baseman.

External links

 

1881 births
1950 deaths
Major League Baseball first basemen
Indianapolis Hoosiers players
Baseball players from Wisconsin
People from Onalaska, Wisconsin
Baseball players from Indianapolis
Minor league baseball managers
Fargo (minor league baseball) players
Calumet Aristocrats players
Green Bay Tigers players
Wausau Lumberjacks players
Milwaukee Brewers (minor league) players
Terre Haute Terre-iers players
Peterborough Petes (baseball) players
Indianapolis Hoosiers (minor league) players